The 2022 Ceará state election took place in the state of Ceará, Brazil on 2 October 2022. Voters elected the President and Vice President of the Republic, a Governor, Vice Governor of the State and a Senator of the Republic with two alternates, in addition to 22 Federal Deputies and 46 State Deputies. Those elected will take office on January 1 (President, Governor and their respective vices) or February 1 (senator and deputies) of 2023 for terms on office lasting for four years (except in the case of the senator, who'll have a term on office for eight years). 

The incumbent governor, Izolda Cela, who became governor after the resignation of Camilo Santana (PT) is affiliated to the Democratic Labour Party (PDT). She was eligible for a second term, but the party's nominee was Roberto Cláudio, after an internal dispute where the former mayor of Fortaleza won. For the election to the Federal Senate, the seat occupied by Tasso Jereissati, elected in 2014 by the Brazilian Social Democracy Party (PSDB), was at dispute. However, the senator said he would not run for reelection.

Electoral calendar

Gubernatorial candidates 
The party conventions began on July 20th and will continue until August 5th. The following political parties have already confirmed their candidacies. Political parties have until August 15, 2022 to formally register their candidates.

Confirmed candidacies

Withdrawn candidacies 

 Evandro Leitão (PDT) - State deputy of Ceará (since 2015) and President of the Legislative Assembly of Ceará (2021–2022). He had previously declared that he was working with the intention of his own re-election as a state deputy. In April, he signaled support for the candidacy of the governor of Ceará, Izolda Cela. 
 Mauro Benevides Filho (PDT) - Federal deputy from Ceará and state deputy of Ceará (1991–2015). He announced the withdrawal of his candidacy in the name of an internal unity in the party.

Senatorial candidates 
Political parties have until August 15, 2022 to formally register their candidates.

Confirmed candidacies

Rejected candidacies 

 Carlos Silva: His candidacy was rejected because he did not report to the Brazilian Election Justice about previous electoral expenses in his campaign for the prefecture of the Ceará municipality of Iguatu in 2020. However, an appeal was filed against the decision and the candidate remains, until the moment, eligible to run in the election.

Withdrawn candidacies 

 Amarílio Macedo: Initially, the directory in Ceará of the Always Forward federation (composed by the Brazilian Social Democracy Party and Cidadania), under the command of Chiquinho Feitosa, one of the alternate senators of Tasso Jereissati, held a convention that defined the neutrality of the federation in the gubernatorial and senatorial elections. However, the federation's national directory, influenced by Jereissati, who obtained control of the state directory, intervened in the decision and launched the senate candidacy of the businessman Amarílio Macêdo in the From the People, By the People and For the People coalition, an alliance that also supported Roberto Cláudio's candidacy for the state government, with Dr. Cabeto and Regis as the nominees for alternate senators. But later, the Superior Electoral Court of Brazil suspended the resolution that approved Macêdo's name in the ticket, reinstating the previous decision and returning the command of the directory to Feitosa, implying the exclusion of the Always Forward federation from the coalition. 
 Nurse Ana Paula: She had her candidacy for the Senate announced by the Democratic Labour Party to replace the candidacy of Amarílio Macêdo if he could not represent the coalition, but she chose to withdraw to run for the federal deputy, and Érika Amorim was chosen as a candidate by Roberto Cláudio's campaign. 
 Paulo Anacé: He had his candidacy for the Senate announced, but resigned due to the decision of the PSOL REDE Federation to support Camilo Santana's candidacy. With that, he decided to run in the dispute for the position of federal deputy for Ceará.

Legislative Assembly
The result of the last state election and the current situation in the Legislative Assembly of Ceará is given below:

Opinion polls

Governor

First round 
The first round is scheduled to take place on 2 October 2022.

2022

2021

Senator 

2022

2021

Notes

References 

Ceará
2022
2022 elections in Brazil